Ferdinand Humenberger (13 February 1897 – 13 May 1956) was an Austrian professional football player and manager.

Playing career
Humenberger played club football for Austrian side Floridsdorfer AC. He also played at international level for Austria, earning two caps in 1918.

Coaching career
Humenberger coached Italian club Treviso between 1923 and 1924.

He is mentioned as a coach of Danish club KB around 1929 or 1930.

Humenberger was manager of Swedish side AIK between 1930 and 1932, winning the championship in 1932.

Personal life
His brother Karl was also a professional football player and manager.

References

1897 births
1956 deaths
Austrian footballers
Association football midfielders
Austria international footballers
Floridsdorfer AC players
Austrian football managers
Treviso F.B.C. 1993 managers
Kjøbenhavns Boldklub managers
AIK Fotboll managers
Floridsdorfer AC managers
Austrian expatriate football managers
Austrian expatriate sportspeople in Italy
Expatriate football managers in Italy
Austrian expatriate sportspeople in Denmark
Expatriate football managers in Denmark
Austrian expatriate sportspeople in Sweden
Expatriate football managers in Sweden